Agromyza albitarsis is a species of leaf miner fly in the family Agromyzidae.

References

External links

 

Agromyzidae
Articles created by Qbugbot
Insects described in 1830